Alfonso Duarte Múgica leads a battalion that combats the drug cartels (such as the Tijuana Cartel and the Sinaloa Cartel) in Tijuana. In March 2009, President Felipe Calderón "hailed the Baja California anti-drug offensive as a model for the country."

General Duarte received media attention in 2011 after a video was released in which he commented that Cuauhtémoc Cardona, the secretary-general of Baja California, was "drunk, rude and disrespectful."

References

Mexican generals
People of the Mexican Drug War
Year of birth missing (living people)
Living people